This is a list of henchmen, fictional characters serving villains and/or monsters and aliens in the long-running British science fiction television series, Doctor Who. For other related lists, see below.

B

Lance Bennett
Lance Bennett, played by Don Gilet, spiked his fiancée's (Donna Noble) coffee daily with deadly Huon particles during their coffee break, taken while working together at H. C. Clements, under the instruction of the Empress of the Racnoss, as seen in "The Runaway Bride" (2006). When Donna escaped from her with the Doctor, the Empress ordered her Robotic Santas to douse Lance with Huon particles, replacing Donna for her purposes. After Donna was recaptured, the Empress used the two of them to awaken the Racnoss swarm in the centre of the Earth, and dropped Lance down the pit as food for her starving children.

Mother Bloodtide
Mother Bloodtide, played by Linda Clark, was a Carrionite involved in the plot to begin a new Carrionite Empire on Earth, as seen in "The Shakespeare Code" (2007). She, along with the other Carrionites, was eventually captured inside a crystal ball, which the Doctor stored in a casket inside the TARDIS console room (the crystal ball made a brief appearance in "The Unicorn and the Wasp").

C

Joseph C
Joseph C, played by Ronald Fraser, was the consort of Helen A who abandoned his lover during the revolt in the human colony on Terra Alpha, as seen in The Happiness Patrol (1988).

Caw
Caw is a sentient robot parrot from Pheros, voiced by Toby Longworth in The Infinite Quest (2007). He eats gold, apparently using it as a source of nuclear energy, and has a son named Squawk. He was murdered by Gurney.

Li H'sen Chang
Li H'sen Chang, played by John Bennett in yellowface, was a stage magician in the employ of Magnus Greel, as seen in The Talons of Weng-Chiang (1977).

Actor John Bennett previously appeared in Doctor Who as General Finch in Invasion of the Dinosaurs (1974).

"Oliver Charles"
Oliver Charles was the assumed name of a member of the Slitheen family, the real Oliver Charles having been murdered for his skin. After murdering General Asquith, played by Rupert Vansittart, in "Aliens of London" (2005), this Raxacoricofallapatorian assumed his identity, which he maintained until his presumed death in "World War Three" (2005).

Chief Scientist
The Chief Scientist, played by Vernon Dobtcheff, was the alien responsible for the mental conditioning of the humans held in the war zones, as seen in The War Games (1969).

Chip
Chip, a tattooed force-grown clone played by Sean Gallagher, was Lady Cassandra's manservant, as seen in "New Earth" (2006). He voluntarily became Cassandra's final host after they developed the psychograft. Chip's clone body had a half-life and began to fail. Before dying, Chip (with Cassandra's consciousness) was taken by the Doctor to a party to meet Cassandra's past self, telling her she is beautiful, which Cassandra had remembered as the last time anyone had said that to her.

Condo
Condo served the evil surgeon Solon in The Brain of Morbius (1976). Upon finding Condo shipwrecked, Solon amputated Condo's hand and replaced it with a hook, claiming that the amputation was medically necessary in order to save his life. Condo later discovers that his hand had secretly been amputated on purpose by Solon for the Frankenstein-like body created to eventually house the brain of the evil timelord Morbius.

Mr. Crane
Mr. Crane, played by Colin Spaull, was responsible for converting humans into Cybermen in Battersea Power Station, as seen in "Rise of the Cybermen" (2006). He turned against his boss, John Lumic, in "The Age of Steel" (2006), when he tried to have him converted into a Cyberman. Crane damaged Lumic's life support system and was then killed by a Cyberman. Crane's actions prompted the Cybermen to "upgrade" Lumic prematurely, converting him into a Cyber Controller.

Actor Colin Spaull previously appeared in Doctor Who as Lilt in Revelation of the Daleks (1985).

Crozier
Crozier, played by Patrick Ryecart, was a human scientist who led the experiments in mind transference, as seen in Mindwarp (1986), seeking to save Lord Kiv from brain compression. After experimenting on a Raak, the Matrix evidence shown at the Doctor's trial indicated that Crozier was successful in transferring Kiv's mind into Peri's brain. It was his work that prompted the High Council of Gallifrey to interfere with events. The Matrix evidence showed that the Time Lords' interference resulted in King Yrcanos attacking Crozier's lab, killing him and Peri, the new host of Kiv's mind. It was later revealed that the Matrix evidence had been falsified by the Valeyard and that Peri had in fact survived and married Yrcanos. Crozier's ultimate fate is therefore unclear.

D

Dalek Caan

Dalek Jast

Dalek Sec

Dalek Thay

Dalek Trooper
The Dalek Troopers were human slaves to the Daleks in the Fifth Doctor story, Resurrection of the Daleks (1984). They were planning to attack a prison spaceship to free Davros and performed their orders without question, but were ultimately killed by the Daleks.

Lucius Petrus Dextrus
Lucius Petrus Dextrus was a Roman soothsayer in The Fires of Pompeii. He breathed in dust from Mount Vesuvius, which was created by the Pyroviles, and gave him false predictions of a brighter future for Pompeii. His right arm was turned to stone, a process which, if carried out completely, would have turned him into a Human-Pyrovile hybrid. He helped the Pyroviles assemble circuitboards they needed to transform Earth into a new Pyrovilia. He was presumably inside the volcano when it erupted. Petrus Dextrus translates from Latin as Stone Right Arm. He was portrayed by Phil Davis.

Mr Diagoras
Mr Diagoras, played by Eric Loren, headed the construction of the Empire State Building for the Daleks in "Daleks in Manhattan" (2007). He fought in the Great War, which left him damaged by the horrors he had seen. He raised himself from being a foreman to being the wealthy, ruthless businessman seen in this episode. Believing Diagoras to be the most Dalek-like human they had encountered, Dalek Sec chose to merge with him against his comrades' wishes to become a Human Dalek. The other members of the Cult of Skaro had doubts about the Human/Dalek project, so they later assumed Dalek Caan in charge. Sec/Diagoras saved the Doctor's life, getting in the way of a Dalek death ray, aimed at the Doctor.

Dibber
Dibber, played by Glen Murphy, was Sabalom Glitz's partner in The Mysterious Planet (1986). He didn't reappear in Dragonfire, suggesting Glitz sold or killed him, or they had a falling-out.

Actor Glen Murphy had previously appeared in Doctor Who as an uncredited Kinda Tribesman in Kinda (1982).

Mother Doomfinger
Mother Doomfinger, played by Amanda Lawrence, was a Carrionite involved in the plot to begin a new Carrionite Empire on Earth, as seen in "The Shakespeare Code" (2007). She was capable of stopping a man's heart simply by touching him. She, along with the other Carrionites, was eventually captured inside a crystal ball, which the Doctor stored on a shelf inside the TARDIS.

F

Mr Fibuli
Mr Fibuli, played by Andrew Robertson, served The Captain in The Pirate Planet (1978).

G

Chancellor Goth

A high-ranking Time lord politician, Goth was in fact a willing servant to the Master who was killed by the Doctor through a mental battle via the Matrix.

Gwendoline

H

Gatherer Hade

Gatherer Hade, played by Richard Leech, as seen in The Sun Makers (1977), ruled over the city of Megropolis One on Pluto and organised the collection of the taxes paid by the citizens to the company. The pompous official lauded praise upon the Company and his Usurian boss, the Collector. Challenging the revolutionaries that had broken out onto the roof of the city, Hade was thrown off the building to his death.

Novice Hame

Novice Hame, played by Anna Hope, was a member of the Sisters of Plenitude first seen in "New Earth" (2006) and in its accompanying TARDISODE. She was looking after the Face of Boe whilst he was hospitalised on Ward 26. She was eventually arrested by New New York Police Department for having kept the Sisters' secret, that they had built a farm of cloned humans infected with all known diseases in order to research cures.

"Gridlock" (2007), set 30 years after the events of "New Earth", revealed that in the intervening time she was ordered to attend the Face of Boe as penance for her part in the Sisterhood. After the airborne 'Bliss' virus killed the New New York Senate and most of the New Earth population, Hame, (who had been saved from the virus by the Face of Boe in his smoke), aided the Face in sealing off the Under-City of New New York, thereby saving those on the Motorway and in the streets there. Having been sent to find the Tenth Doctor by the Face of Boe, she found him deep in the Motorway as he was looking for Martha Jones. She teleported him to the New New York Senate so that the Face of Boe could deliver his final message. After helping the Doctor and the Face of Boe save the Under-City civilians from eternal imprisonment on the Motorway, Hame was with them as the Face died, after imparting his final words to the Doctor. Her fate after this point is unknown, but the Doctor later says to Martha that "they've got Novice Hame", suggesting she will subsequently have a larger role in the governance of New New York and/or New Earth.

Captain Hardaker
Captain Hardaker, played by Geoffrey Palmer in "Voyage of the Damned", was the Captain of the S.S. Titanic, a ship from Max Capricorn Cruiselines modelled after the Earth ocean liner of the same name. Hardaker was a veteran officer in the company and long-time Captain of his ship. With a terminal illness, he accepted a large sum of money (to leave behind for his family) from Max Capricorn to crash the Titanic into the Earth. This was key to Capricorn's scheme to frame the board of directors for mass murder. Hardaker facilitated this by dismissing all officers from the bridge, but Midshipman Alonzo Frame refused to go, citing the regulation that two officers were required on the bridge at any one time. Despite Frame's interference, Hardaker lowered the shields and magnetised the hull to draw in a meteor storm. The meteors struck the ship, dealing tremendous structural damage and killing many of the passengers. A support structure on the bridge collapsed and killed Hardaker, leaving Frame helpless to prevent the Titanic from plunging toward Earth.

Geoffrey Palmer appeared twice before in Doctor Who. In the 1970 serial, Doctor Who and the Silurians (over 35 years before "Voyage of the Damned"), and in the 1972 serial The Mutants.

Councillor Hedin

Hedin was a high-ranking and respected Time Lord politician who was said to have been a good friend of the Doctor before he left Gallifrey. In fact, Hedin was in league with the renegade and powerful Time Lord Omega because he believed Omega deserved freedom and recognition for his achievements, and contribution to Time Lord history. The Doctor knew this was a mistake and tried to reason with Hedin, who was suddenly killed by saving the Doctor's life from a shot fired by one of the Castellan's guards.

Sir George Hutchinson

K

Daisy K

Karen
Karen is a character in Big Finish Productions series of Eighth Doctor New Adventures originally on BBC7 radio. She is played by Louise Fullerton and later Kerry Godliman.

She first meets the Eighth Doctor and Lucie Miller in Human Resources. She and Lucie believed they were working in a simple modern day office in Telford. But in truth, they were partially hypnotised war strategists inside a giant battle robot that walked an alien world fighting the Cybermen. Despite being a simple human with a humble job, some Time Lords believed Karen had the potential to become an oppressive dictator. This fact drew the attention of a villain-for-hire named The Headhunter, who hired Karen as her assistant. The next time the Headhunter appears, Karen is at her side, helping to steal an alien diamond in Grand Theft Cosmos. Karen returned in The Eight Truths/Worldwide Web; however, she was played by a different actress, Kerry Godliman.

L

Lytton
Commander Lytton is a mercenary whom the Doctor encountered twice. He was born on a satellite called Riften 5, orbiting the planet Vita 15 some centuries in the future. The novelisation of Attack of the Cybermen states that his first name is Gustave.

When the Fifth Doctor met Lytton during Resurrection of the Daleks (1984), he was working for the Daleks in a plot to rescue Davros from imprisonment following the events in Destiny of the Daleks. It transpired that all the Daleks' humanoid operatives were clone-duplicates (with the memories of the originals downloaded), ensuring their obedience—but the conditioning proved unstable and the destroyed originals' minds could reassert control. Lytton, who soon turned against his masters, was presumably an example of this. When Davros altered some of the Daleks to be loyal to him and tried to seize control from the Dalek Supreme, Lytton was one of the few survivors of the ensuing battle. Though he attempted briefly to shoot the Doctor, they did not meet and he escaped from the carnage in the guise of a policeman.

The Sixth Doctor then encountered Lytton planning to rob a diamond merchant in the story Attack of the Cybermen (1985). The sewers through which he planned to make his heist also contained a squad of Cybermen, and Lytton's actions helped revive them. After being taken to Telos with Lytton and the Cybermen, the Doctor encountered the Cryons, who revealed that Lytton was in fact working for them. The Cybermen had travelled back in time to prevent the destruction of their home planet Mondas in 1986. However, once they did so the Cybermen intended to destroy and leave Telos. Lytton's mission was to prevent this by stealing the time machine.

Once Lytton's treachery to the Cybermen was exposed, the Cyber Controller ordered that Lytton undergo the cyber-conversion process. When the Doctor tried to free Lytton from his fate as a Cyberman, a partially converted Lytton died fighting the Cyber Controller, who snapped his neck. The Doctor later admitted that he had badly misjudged Lytton, though their encounters had been severely limited.

A video on the official website for The Sarah Jane Adventures mentions that Sarah Jane Smith investigated a criminal group called the "Lytton Gang" in 1985, including a woman who claimed to be carrying Lytton's alien baby. The gang was attempting to loot the Bank of England.

M

Gilbert M
Gilbert M, played by Harold Innocent, created the sadistic Kandy Man, as seen in The Happiness Patrol (1988). Unhappy with Helen A's control of the planet, Gilbert fled with her husband Joseph B; both had left behind terrible things, the Kanyman and Fifi.

Theodore Maxtible
Theodore Maxtible is an antagonist from The Evil of the Daleks (1967). He was played by Marius Goring.

Mr Magpie

Mr Magpie played by Ron Cook, as seen in "The Idiot's Lantern" (2006), owned Magpie Electricals, a shop selling electrical devices such as televisions. The Wire arrived on Earth in one of this televisions, briefly taking Magpie's face; however, she put it back, with a burning pain "behind [his] eyes", forcing him to cooperate. When the Wire begins feasting on the minds of those watching the coronation, Magpie reminds her that she promised him peace; she cruelly tells him that he will have peace, vaporising him at the cost of overexerting herself.

Mordred

N

Nimrod

Nyder
Nyder, played by Peter Miles, was the Security Commander for the Kaled Scientific Elite and an assistant to their chief scientist Davros, as seen in Genesis of the Daleks (1975). Nyder was killed by the Daleks after he attempted to carry out one of Davros's instructions against the will of the Daleks.

Actor Peter Miles had previously appeared in Doctor Who as Dr. Lawrence in Doctor Who and the Silurians (1970) and as Professor Whitaker in Invasion of the Dinosaurs (1974).

Miles reprised his role as Nyder in 1992 and again in 2005 serving as a witness for Davros in the theatrical production The Trial of Davros. In 2006, he played Nyder as a younger Lieutenant for the Big Finish Productions audio drama I, Davros: Guilt.

O

Adeola Oshodi

Adeola Oshodi, known familiarly as "Adi" (played by Freema Agyeman in "Army of Ghosts") was a technician at Torchwood One, where she worked on its free energy project. When finding a place to make a romantic liaison with her co-worker Gareth Evans, she was seized and cyber-converted by Cybermen from a parallel universe, who had slipped through the Void through a breach in space-time and infiltrated Torchwood Tower. Her "upgrade" was internal, through an earpiece linked with connective tissue directly to her brain. She was killed definitively when her earpiece was overloaded by a signal from the Tenth Doctor.

Freema Agyeman later appeared as Adeola's cousin and companion to the Tenth Doctor, Martha Jones. Martha mentioned her deceased cousin in her debut episode "Smith and Jones". The Doctor felt guilt for not being able to save Adeola, and apologised to Martha.

P

Mrs Pritchard

R

Mr Ratcliffe
Mr Ratcliffe, builder's merchant and head of fascist group 'The Association', as played by George Sewell and seen in Remembrance of the Daleks (1988), was allied to the Renegade Daleks in London in 1963. He was enlisted by them to help with retrieving the Hand of Omega. After assisting in the killings of those the Daleks opposed, he attempted to abscond with the Renegade Daleks' time controller and was killed by the girl slaved to their battle computer. Mr Ratcliffe associated with Sergeant Mike Smith.

Robomen
Robomen were brainwashed human males forced to serve the Daleks in The Dalek Invasion of Earth (1964) controlled via helmets. The mind control technique was unstable and Robomen would eventually go insane and commit suicide. Craddock, played by Michael Goldie, was converted into a Roboman during The Dalek Invasion of Earth and was electrocuted after fighting Ian. Phil Madison was similarly converted and was killed by his brother, Larry, played by Graham Rigby, after Phil shot and mortally wounded him. Larry stirred Phil's memory, his dying word being "Larry..." The surviving Robomen were eventually liberated by the Doctor, Susan, Barbara and David Campbell and they fought against the Daleks.

Peter Badger and Martyn Huntley played two of the Robomen. Martyn Huntley had previously played the First Human in The Sensorites (1964) and reappeared in Doctor Who as Warren Earp in The Gunfighters (1966).

Robomen reappeared in the Big Finish audio production The Mutant Phase, in which the Fifth Doctor (played by Peter Davison), accompanied by Nyssa (portrayed by Sarah Sutton), arrive on Earth during the Dalek Invasion, in 2158. They also appear when the Daleks invade Earth again in the Eighth Doctor story Lucie Miller / To the Death. The graphic novel The Only Good Dalek featured several Robomen on a space station where various objects and lifeforms related to the Daleks were housed, with the Robomen eventually joining in the Dalek assault on the station. The Robomen have a small role in Energy of the Daleks, where the Fourth Doctor and Leela face a Dalek time squad from the future in 2025, the Doctor explicitly stating that the use of Robomen is a sign that the Daleks' resources are limited. In the audio Masters of Earth, the Sixth Doctor and Peri Brown arrive on Earth in 2163 where they became involved in a Dalek plot to create a new, more efficient form of Robomen, although the Doctor is forced to kill the subjects of this experiment when they try and use the Robomen technology to augment humanity to oppose the Daleks, the Doctor concerned that this approach will make humanity the new Daleks. In Doctor Who: The Third Doctor Adventures Volume 3: The Conquest of Far, the Third Doctor and Jo stop a Dalek plan to deploy a massive transmitter that will enable mass conversion of the opposing human army into Robomen, the Doctor using the transmitter to overload most of the Dalek army so that the rest can be dealt with more conventionally.

Robomen also featured in the cinematic version of this story Daleks' Invasion Earth 2150 A.D. (1966), as did the ill-fated character of Craddock, then played by Kenneth Watson who went on to appear in the television series of Doctor Who as Bill Duggan in The Wheel in Space (1968), co-starring the original Craddock, Michael Goldie, as Elton Laleham.

S

Lucy Saxon
Lucy Saxon, played by Alexandra Moen, is the wife of Harold Saxon (the Master) during his tenure as Minister of Defence and Prime Minister of the United Kingdom. When confronted by journalist, Vivien Rook, about her husband's fictitious life history, Lucy reveals the Master's presence in the room; Rook is then murdered by the Master's Toclafane allies.

The Master refers to Lucy as his "faithful companion". Despite apprehension and occasional squeamishness, she appears to be his willing accomplice and confidante. She does not display concern at the obvious severity of the Master's plans, and is seen dancing to "Voodoo Child" while six billion Toclafane descend upon the Earth.

The tie-in website archived from haroldsaxon.co.uk describes Lucy as the youngest child of Lord Cole of Tarminster (in "The Sound of Drums", she refers to her gratitude for "all [Mr. Saxon] did for my father", and is said to be "of good family" by Rook) but never planned to follow her father's footsteps into politics. She went to Roedean School (Rook describes her as "not especially bright but essentially harmless"). She was on the Sussex netball team and studied Italian at St Andrews.

She met Saxon during the publication of his autobiography and they married in 2007, the year prior to the events of "The Sound of Drums".

In "Last of the Time Lords", set a year later, Lucy appears in a more opulent costume than before (a red evening dress and with red nail varnish), but with bruises around her right eye and a less enthusiastic attitude, suggesting physical and emotional abuse by the Master. When Martha confronts the Master and humans start to chant "Doctor", Lucy joins their chanting. She later shoots the Master, killing him, and is imprisoned soon after at Broadfell Prison. In "The End of Time", Lucy is used against her will to provide the Master's biometric imprint to complete his resurrection. Aware of the Master's plan, Lucy used her connections to develop a potion to sabotage the Master's resurrection, causing an explosion that kills her, destroys the prison, and leaves the Master in a dying body.

Scorby

Scorby is the mercenary and chief henchman of the millionaire and plant-collector Harrison Chase. He is sent by Chase, to a scientific research base in Antarctica, along with the scientist Arnold Keeler, to steal a newly discovered plant pod found buried in the ice there. He attempts to kill the Doctor, Sarah Jane, and several others in an explosion, as a means to eliminate them all as witnesses, and obscure traces of the theft. The plant pod turns out to be the seed of a dangerous plant-based alien life-form known as a Krynoid. Later, when it becomes apparent to him that his employer is now possessed by the alien Krynoid, Scorby reluctantly helps the Doctor, Sarah and UNIT remove all the plants from Chase's laboratory, as they may come under Krynoid control, whilst they are all under siege from the rapidly growing Krynoid. Scorby then meets his end when he panics, and attempts to flee the besieged mansion via the garden, only to come under attack from the Krynoid-controlled plants there and be dragged into the pond and drowned by the weeds.

Mr Sin

Mr Sin, played by Deep Roy, aids Li H'sen Chang in The Talons of Weng-Chiang (1977). Originally known as the Peking Homunculus, it is a cyborg from the 51st century that has the cerebral cortex of a pig. Designed as a toy, it almost causes World War Six when its organic parts assert themselves and it kills the Commissioner of the Icelandic Alliance and his family. It later accompanies Magnus Greel when he escapes to the 19th century. Its love of slaughter and hatred of mankind eventually lead it to betray Greel, after which it is deactivated by the Doctor when he disconnects the fuse circuit in its back.

Mr Sin returns in the Virgin Missing Adventures novel The Shadow of Weng-Chiang. In a retcon, the book claims it was originally an assassination device disguised as a toy by enemies of the Icelandic Alliance. After being used by a tong with connections to Greel, it is deactivated again, and destroyed by K-9. The canonicity of the novels is unclear. It is possible that Mr. Sin was based on the Chinese dwarf god Kui Xing.

The incident with The Commissioner of the Icelandic Alliance is played out in the 2012 prequel audio story The Butcher of Brisbane, in which the Fifth Doctor averts the world war, after allowing Greel and Sin to escape in their time cabinet.

Sergeant Mike Smith

Sergeant Mike Smith, seen in Remembrance of the Daleks (1988) as played by Dursley McLinden, was an RAF non-commissioned officer who served under Group Captain Gilmore. He struck a bond with Ace, whom he met in a café—a bond that was shattered when he was revealed to be a fascist in league with associate Mr Ratcliffe and the Renegade Daleks in pursuit of the Hand of Omega. Along with Mr Ratcliffe, Mike attempted to abscond with the Renegades' time controller. He was killed at his mother's boarding house by a girl possessed by the Renegade Daleks' battle computer. Unusually for a character killed in Doctor Who, the Doctor and his companion were seen to attend his funeral, although they left early.

General Smythe 
General Smythe was an antagonist in The War Games (1969). He was played by Noel Coleman.

Slab
Slabs are slaves that were used in the episode "Smith and Jones" as henchmen for a creature known as a Plasmavore. The Doctor mentions that the Slabs are made of leather throughout their entire bodies. In external appearance, they appear as humanoid forms wearing leather all over and a black motorcycle helmet with the visor down, bearing a resemblance to motorcycle delivery-men which is noted by various human characters. Slabs (or similar creatures) also appeared in The Sarah Jane Adventures story Warriors of Kudlak.

Squawk
Squawk is a robot parrot from Pheros, voiced by Toby Longworth in The Infinite Quest (2007). He eats gold, and is the son of the deceased Caw.

T

Lady Thaw
Lady Sylvia Thaw, played by Thelma Barlow, was the partner both personally and professionally of Professor Richard Lazarus in the episode "The Lazarus Experiment" (2007). She was an old lady associated with LazLabs Finances. She was liaising with Mr Saxon. After Lazarus successfully rejuvenated himself, she wanted to be first in line for rejuvenation. Lazarus rejected her saying he had grown tired of her. When Thaw threatened to complain to Saxon, Lazarus transformed into a large, scorpion-like monster and sucked the life out of her ultimately killing her.

Maylin Tekker
The word "Maylin" being his rank, Tekker was a Karfelan who was a henchman of the Borad in the 1985 serial Timelash, promoted after the previous Maylin, Renis, was killed by the Borad. Upon hearing of the Borad's genocidal plans to wipe out his people, Tekker defected from the Borad's side, only to be instantly killed by a weapon of the Borad's that caused rapid ageing.

V

Captain von Weich
Captain von Weich, played by David Garfield, was the alien who headed the German troops held in the First World War zone and Confederate troops in the American Civil War zone in The War Games (1969). He was shot dead by Private Moor.

W

Mr Wagner
Mr Wagner, played by Eugene Washington, was the alias of a Krillitane who posed as a Maths teacher at Deffry Vale School in "School Reunion" (2006). He was presumed killed when the school exploded. In one deleted scene he is seen going organic after having eaten nothing but rats.

See also
 List of Doctor Who supporting characters
 List of Doctor Who villains
 List of Doctor Who creatures and aliens
 List of Doctor Who robots
 List of Torchwood minor characters
 List of Torchwood monsters and aliens
 List of The Sarah Jane Adventures minor characters
 List of The Sarah Jane Adventures monsters and aliens

References

Henchmen
Doctor Who henchmen
Henchmen